The Knox River is a  river in western New Hampshire in the United States. The river is an inlet of Mascoma Lake, which drains by the Mascoma River to the Connecticut River and ultimately Long Island Sound.

The Knox River lies entirely in the town of Enfield. It begins at the village of Fish Market as the outlet of George Pond and flows northwest through Enfield Center to the southeastern end of Mascoma Lake. The river is paralleled for its entire length by New Hampshire Route 4A.

See also

List of rivers of New Hampshire

References

Rivers of New Hampshire
Tributaries of the Connecticut River
Rivers of Grafton County, New Hampshire